David Mensch (born 14 August 1972) is a former Australian rules footballer who played with Geelong in the Australian Football League.

Mensch was a half forward and played in two losing grand final teams. He was the joint leading goal kicker for Geelong in 2000 with 39 goals

After finishing his AFL career Mensch played with Mansfield in the Goulburn Valley Football League (GVFL) where he was a star player in their premiership side. He returned to coach Grovedale in the Geelong Football League and is now currently playing for Anglesea in the Bellarine Football League.

External links

1972 births
Living people
Australian rules footballers from Victoria (Australia)
Geelong Football Club players
Mansfield Football Club players
Grovedale Football Club players
Australian people of German descent
Darwin Football Club players